City of Pain is a 1949 Italian drama film directed by Mario Bonnard.

It was shown as part of a retrospective "Questi fantasmi: Cinema italiano ritrovato" at the 65th Venice International Film Festival.

Cast 
Luigi Tosi as Berto
Barbara Costanova as Silvana
Gianni Rizzo as Sergio
Constance Dowling as Lubiza
Elio Steiner as Martini
Anita Farra
Attilio Dottesio
Gustavo Serena
Pina Piovani

References

External links

1948 films
Italian drama films
Films directed by Mario Bonnard
Italian black-and-white films
1948 drama films
1940s Italian films
1940s Italian-language films